Pseudonocardia chloroethenivorans is a trichloroethene degrading bacterium from the genus of Pseudonocardia.

References

Pseudonocardia
Bacteria described in 2004